Héctor Fabio Cárdenas Berrío (born 28 August 1979) is a Colombian football manager, currently in charge of the Colombia national under-20 team.

Career
Born in Cali, Cárdenas worked for the Valle del Cauca Department League and Boca Juniors de Cali before joining Deportivo Cali in 2011, as a youth coach. On 9 October 2012, he was named interim manager of the first team for the remainder of the season, after Julio Comesaña resigned.

Cárdenas returned to his previous role after the appointment of Leonel Álvarez, but was named manager of the club on 26 February 2014, after Álvarez was sacked. On 2 December 2014, Deportivo Cali announced that Cárdenas would not be the manager of the club for the ensuing campaign, and he subsequently returned to the youth setup.

On 13 March 2017, Cárdenas was again named manager of the first team in the place of Mario Yepes. On 17 October, however, he was himself dismissed.

On 30 May 2018, Cárdenas was appointed manager of the Colombia national under-17 team. He became the manager of the under-20s on 16 February 2022, being also named interim manager of the full side in May.

References

External links

1979 births
Living people
Sportspeople from Cali
Colombian football managers
Categoría Primera A managers
Deportivo Cali managers
Colombia national under-20 football team managers
Colombia national football team managers